The Ceylon National Guard (CNG) was a former Volunteer regiment of the Sri Lanka Army that existed from 1963 to 1980. The CNG was formed in 1962 as part of the reforms to the Ceylon Volunteer Force in the Ceylon Army following the 1962 Ceylonese coup d'état attempt in which several volunteer units were implicated. The 2nd (Volunteer) Coastal Artillery Regiment, Ceylon Artillery and the 2nd (Volunteer) Signals, Ceylon Signals Corps were disbanded and personal from these units who were found to be not part of the attempt coup were re-grouped as the 1st Battalion, CNG and 2nd Battalion, CNG. The CNG was mobilized for duty with the Task Force Anti Illicit Immigration and during the 1971 JVP Insurrection. It was finally disbanded in 1980 after the 1st Battalion was transferred to the Sri Lanka Armoured Corps as the 2nd (Volunteer) Regiment, Sri Lanka Armoured Corps in 1979 and the 2nd Battalion was transferred to the Sri Lanka Artillery as the 5th (Volunteer) Regiment, Sri Lanka Artillery in 1980.

Units 
 1st Battalion, Ceylon National Guard
 2nd Battalion, Ceylon National Guard

Notable members 
 Karu Jayasuriya - Former Speaker of Parliament and Minister

See also 
 Sri Lanka National Guard

References

Disbanded regiments of the Sri Lankan Army
Military units and formations established in 1971
Military units and formations disestablished in 1980
Sri Lanka Army Volunteer Force